Joaquín García Orcoyen (11 March 1905 – December 1934) was a Spanish fencer. He competed in the individual and team sabre events at the 1928 Summer Olympics.

References

External links
 

1905 births
1934 deaths
Spanish male sabre fencers
Olympic fencers of Spain
Fencers at the 1928 Summer Olympics